The Go For It! Roadshow was a health education event for children presented by Birmingham, Alabama-based HealthSouth Corporation from 1995 until 2003. The show featured many celebrity athletes including Bo Jackson, Herschel Walker, and Cory Everson. The Roadshow was overseen by the HealthSouth Sports Medicine Council whose Chairman was Bo Jackson. Board Member Dr. James Andrews came up with the idea for the Sports Medicine Council. The Roadshow was also presented by sponsors The Coca-Cola Company and Travelers Group,

History
The program was started in 1995 by HealthSouth Corporation as an interactive educational program for students to stay healthy and exercise. The program's first show was in Birmingham, Alabama in May 1995 at the Birmingham–Jefferson Convention Complex.

In September 2000, the pop trio group 3rd Faze was created by HealthSouth and its CEO Richard M. Scrushy to perform on the Roadshow tour. 3rd Faze was made up of singers Halie Clark, Minia Corominas and Sara Marie Rauch. The tour also featured Dream Street.

Television series
The Roadshow also had a related television game show component program called Go For It! TV, produced by Mandalay Sports Action Entertainment and Litton Entertainment from 1999–2002 and sponsored by HealthSouth, which was designed to meet the Federal Communications Commission's educational and informational guidelines. The show was run Saturday mornings on the USA Network for the first series of episodes in late 2001, ABC Family for the second and third series of episodes in 2002, also on Saturdays, and in syndicated reruns between 2003 and 2005. Co-hosted by Tymisha Harris and Nicky Brown, the game show was structured in the same way as Fun House, Nickelodeon GUTS, and Finders Keepers with teams (named under such common high school labels such as "Artists", "Jocks", and "Brains", etc.) competing to be their episode's "Go for It TV Champions" through a series of physical and mental challenges, including questions about physical education, geography, and other social sciences, along with a tournament component where an ultimate season team champion was named. The program also featured interstitial performances from 3rd Faze, along with other teen groups of the day such as Dream Street, B2K, and Jump5. Segments featuring basic health tips from athletes endorsing HealthSouth also appeared through the course of the show.

Although the program went out of production after HealthSouth's accounting scandal was exposed, Litton continues to syndicate the program as of 2012, though with most references to HealthSouth and other sponsors scrubbed out where technically possible.

Discontinuation
In February 2003, HealthSouth announced that it was suspending the Roadshow as a result of financial losses at the company. After an accounting fraud was announced at the company in March 2003, the Roadshow was canceled indefinitely.

First-run syndicated television programs in the United States
1990s American children's game shows
2000s American children's game shows
American children's education television series